Steve Bell is an American football coach. He is the head football coach at Augustana College in Rock Island, Illinois, a position h has held since the 2015 season. Bell served as the head football coach at Monmouth College in Monmouth, Illinois from 2000 to 2014.

Head coaching record

References

External links
 Augustana profile

Year of birth missing (living people)
Living people
Augustana (Illinois) Vikings football coaches
Bemidji State Beavers football coaches
MacMurray Highlanders football coaches
Monmouth Fighting Scots football coaches
Bemidji State University alumni